Surfactant protein A is an innate immune system collectin. It is water-soluble and has collagen-like domains similar to SP-D. It is part of the innate immune system and is used to opsonize bacterial cells in the alveoli marking them for phagocytosis by alveolar macrophages. SP-A may also play a role in negative feedback limiting the secretion of pulmonary surfactant. SP-A is not required for pulmonary surfactant to function but does confer immune effects to the organism.

During parturition
The role of surfactant protein A (SP-A) in childbirth is indicated in studies with mice. Mice which gestate for 19 days typically show signs of SP-A in amniotic fluid at around 16 days. If SP-A is injected into the uterus at 15 days, mice typically deliver early. Inversely, an SP-A inhibitor injection causes notable delays in birth.

The presence of surfactant protein A seemed to trigger an inflammatory response in the uterus of the mice, but later studies found an anti-inflammatory response in humans. In fact, the level of SP-A in a human uterus typically decreases during labor.

Immune functions
Research on SP-A has been done mainly in rodents including mice and rats. This research has shown that mice deficient in SP-A are more susceptible to infections from group B Streptoccoal organisms, Pseudomonas aeruginosa, and likely other organisms. The immune functions of SP-A are time, temperature, and concentration dependant.

Location
SP-A is found in the pulmonary surfactant in lungs. SP-A and SP-D are also present in extrapulmonary tissues.

See also 
 pulmonary surfactant
 SFTPA1
 SFTPA2

External links

References 

Collectins